Mateusz Wilangowski (born 7 October 1991) is a Polish rower.  He is the reigning world champion in the men's coxless four won at the 2019 World Rowing Championships. He competed in the men's eight event at the 2016 Summer Olympics.

References

External links
 

1991 births
Living people
Polish male rowers
Olympic rowers of Poland
Rowers at the 2016 Summer Olympics
World Rowing Championships medalists for Poland
People from Grudziądz County
Rowers at the 2020 Summer Olympics
21st-century Polish people